Shonica Wharton (born 12 June 1996) is a Barbadian netball player who represents Barbados internationally and plays in the positions of goal shooter and goal keeper. She competed at the Netball World Cup on two occasions in 2015 and 2019. She also represented Barbados at the Commonwealth Games in 2014 and 2018.

References 

1996 births
Living people
Barbadian netball players
Netball players at the 2014 Commonwealth Games

Netball players at the 2018 Commonwealth Games
Commonwealth Games competitors for Barbados
2019 Netball World Cup players
Sportspeople from Bridgetown
2015 Netball World Cup players